Frank Wieneke (born 31 January 1962 in Hannover) is a German judoka and olympic champion. He won a gold medal in the half middleweight division at the 1984 Summer Olympics in Los Angeles. He is a member of Germany's Sports Hall of Fame.

Career 
Among other accomplishments, he became an Olympic gold medalist in the 1984 Olympic Games in Los Angeles, and a silver medalist in the 1988 Olympic Games in Seoul, both in the half-middleweight class. In addition, he was seven-time champion at the international or German national levels, and was once European champion and twice runner-up in European championships. Mr. Wieneke was a starter for VfL Wolfsburg, and during his career as a competing judoka, from 1979 to 1992, he was a member of the German National Team.

Since 2001, Frank Wieneke coached the German Olympic first team. He coached Ole Bischof to a gold medal in the 2008 Olympic Games in Beijing. On 25 February 2018, at the occasion of the 2018 Düsseldorf Grand Slam IJF Tournament, the German Judo Federation publicly announced it had promoted Wieneke, at that point 56 years of age, to judo 8th dan black belt.

On 31 December 2008 Frank Wieneke ended his eight-year stint as full-time coach to the German National Team (Men under 23) for the German Judo Federation. From January 2009, he is scientific lecturer at the Coaching Academy in Cologne, responsible for the training and continuing training in the degreed trainer study track. Wieneke's successor coach of the German National Team is Detlef Ultsch. In 2016, Mr. Wieneke was inducted into the German Sports Hall of Fame. He lives together with his wife Marita and two children in the vicinity of Cologne.

Individual achievements as a competing judoka 
 1980 3rd place in the European Championships in Lisbon in the Men under 21 age group, under 71 kg weight class
 1981 2nd place in European Championships in San Marino, in the Men under 21 age group, under 71 kg weight class
 1983 Second place in the German Championships in Wurzburg, under 78 kg class
 1984 Olympic gold medalist in the Olympic Games in Los Angeles, in the under 78 kg class
 1985 German Champion in Frankenthal, in the under 78 kg class
 1986 1st place in the European Championships in Belgrade, in the under 78 kg class
 1986 Champion in the Tournoi de Paris, in the under 78 kg class
 1986 International German Champion in Russelsheim, in the under 78 kg class
 1986 German Champion in Munich, in the under 78 kg class
 1987 German Champion in Hannover, in the under 78 kg class
 1988 German Champion in Duisburg, in the under 78 kg class
 1988 Silver medalist in the Olympic Games in Seoul, in the under 78 kg class
 1988 2nd place in the European Championships in Pamplona, in the under 78 kg class
 1989 2nd place in the European Championships in Helsinki, in the under 78 kg class
 1989 5th place in the World Championships in Belgrade, in the under 78 kg class
 1990 German Champion in Heilbronn, in the under 78 kg class

Achievements in team competition 
 1981 European Cup Champions with VfL Wolfsburg
 1986 Continent Cup: Champion with the European Continental Team
 1987 Second Men's European Cup, Finals: US Orleans vs. VfL Wolfsburg
 1988 Second Men's European Cup, Finals: Racing Club of France vs. VfL Wolfsburg

Achievements as coach of the German national team 
 2001 Bronze medal in the World Championships in Munich
 2003 2 Bronze medals in the European Championships in Düsseldorf
 2003 Gold medal in the World Championships in Osaka
 2004 Silver medal in the European Championships in Bucharest
 2004 Bronze medal in the Olympic Games in Athens
 2005 Gold medal in the European Championships in Rotterdam
 2006 Gold and bronze medals in the European Championships in Tampere
 2007 Bronze medal in European Championships in Bucharest
 2008 Bronze medal in the European Championships in Lisbon
 2008 Gold medal in the Olympic Games in Beijing
 2008 Judo Coach of the Year

References

External links
 
 Video footage of Frank Wieneke (judovision.org)

1962 births
Living people
German male judoka
Olympic judoka of West Germany
Judoka at the 1984 Summer Olympics
Judoka at the 1988 Summer Olympics
Olympic gold medalists for West Germany
Olympic silver medalists for West Germany
Olympic medalists in judo
Medalists at the 1988 Summer Olympics
Medalists at the 1984 Summer Olympics
Sportspeople from Hanover
20th-century German people
21st-century German people